The 2020 PDC Nordic & Baltic ProTour consisted of 2 darts tournaments on the 2020 PDC Pro Tour.

Ten events had been scheduled, but due to the COVID-19 pandemic, events in Gothenburg and Copenhagen were cancelled, and a planned restart in Riga was aborted.

Prize money
The prize money for each of the Nordic & Baltic ProTour events had a prize fund of €5,000.

This is how the prize money is divided:

Results

Nordic & Baltic ProTour 1
ProTour 1 was contested on Saturday 29 February 2020 at the Hotelli Tallukka in Vääksy, Finland.

Nordic & Baltic ProTour 2
ProTour 2 was contested on Sunday 1 March 2020 at the Hotelli Tallukka in Vääksy, Finland.

References

2020 in darts
2020 PDC Pro Tour